The T3 is a type of Czech tramcar produced by ČKD Tatra. A late-2000s study conducted on the Prague tram system has shown 98.9% reliability, the best of the Prague tram system fleet. During its period of production between 1960 and 1999, 13,991 powered units and 122 unpowered trailers were sold worldwide. 

It became the most dominant tramcar model in Eastern Bloc countries, except for Poland, where locally produced trams from Konstal factory are still the mainstay in tram systems there. In 1988, the T3 tram entered the Guinness Book of Records as the most widely produced tram in the world. With over 14,000 cars produced, it is still in 2022 the most widespread tram car in the world.

Types

T3 
The design of the T3 had to meet difficult specifications.  The cars needed to have the same capacity as its predecessor (the Tatra T2), but be easier to build. Some of the things that were done to meet this goal were making the walls thinner, and fitting the cars with laminate seats instead of cushioned leatherette seats such as the T2 used. The T3 was delivered to all tramway companies in the former Czechoslovakia. It was most numerous in Prague, where over 1,000 vehicles were delivered. The T3 still forms (mostly in various modernised versions) the backbone of the Czech tram fleet.

T3SU 
(SU for Soviet Union)
As with the T2SU, the first T3SU was delivered with the modification of removing the middle door and replacing it with seats. Later cars, however, were delivered with the third door in place. Again, the vehicles had a closed operator's compartment and were adapted for the harsh climate. Altogether 11,368 T3SU were delivered, making it the largest production of a single type of streetcar worldwide. But because so many of one type were made, their replacement by more modern cars was slow.

The T3SU was delivered from 1963, first to Moscow and later to 33 further Soviet cities.

T3SUCS 
(SUCS for Soviet Union-modified Czechoslovakia)

Originally, the production of the T3 was stopped in 1976 and focus shifted to newer vehicles. The Slovak city Košice, however, ordered two motor coaches as an exception. The production of the replacement type KT8D5 was slated to begin in 1985, but this model was by then obsolete. Further production of the T3 would have been too expensive, so instead vehicles of the type T3SU were re-imported and adapted. The closed operator's cab was maintained, the vehicles had all three doors in place, and differed from the original T3 only in a few details.

T3SU Evolution
Over time, the T3SU has had minor changes in both exterior appearance and interior design.

Exterior details:
 <1966: Narrow passenger windows disappeared
 ~1969: Narrow window route designators
 1980s: Illuminated route  indicator on top
 ~1985: Oval turn indicator at the front became two rectangular lights. The same lamps began to be fitted to the rear
 1983 onwards: Small grid in the forward section of the tram on the left side
 ~1985: Two small red lamps near the tramcar-to-tramcar "control circuit port",  both front and rear
 Additional red horizontal lamps from behind

Interior:
 Early 1960s to early 1970s: Sofa-style seats
 Early 1970s to mid-1980s: "Toilet"-like seats
 1977–1978: Cream-coloured saloon  (repainted yellow/dark-blue)

T3D 
(D for Deutschland)

In East Germany the first three T3D cars started operation in 1964 and the city of Dresden got its first delivery in 1965. They operated as single cars or as multiple units (motor+motor, motor+motor+trailer) and/or as mini trams (motor+trailer). The use of trailer cars was due to the use of original Czech T3 electrical equipment, which had enough power to support trailer cars. However, due to reduced available power, the maximum speed of the streetcar reached only 55 km/h instead of the usual .

Only German and Yugoslav networks had trailer cars. The car was designated as B3D and had the same body as the T3D. Today, only Chemnitz uses T3s in full service as the T3D-M (modified).

T3YU 
(YU for Yugoslavia)

From 1967 onwards, vehicles supplied to Yugoslavia differed from the standard type T3 by having different pantographs and trucks. In addition, trailer cars were used, as in East Germany. Uncommonly, the network used narrow-profile vehicles, two of which could be found in Czechoslovakia and one in the Soviet Union.

T3R 
(R for Romania)

At the end of the 1960s, Romania ordered RA cars as part of an agreement in the Comecon. The first vehicles came in 1970 to the city of Galați and had different electrical equipment from the Czechoslovak vehicles, to use the network's 750 V DC voltage. Since the carbodies were built too wide for use elsewhere, they remained in Galați. Only 50 units were delivered. Romania then opted for the narrower Tatra T4, which had more success, being still used in Bucharest as of 2019.

A few more of the same type were manufactured in 1997.

T3RF 
(RF for Russian Federation)

Four Tatra T3RF were the very last T3 trams built. They were made for Samara and Izhevsk, but only Samara bought them. In 2002 the two others were sold to Brno and modernized.

Modernized Tatra-T3 trams
In most Czech cities and in some others such as Bratislava, Moscow, Riga, and Odessa, Tatra-T3 trams became very common. As a result, service and maintenance workers became very experienced at servicing them. This was one reason for modifying existing trams rather than replacing them with newer stock (the other being cost).

Modernization normally includes: 
 Restoration of the car body
 Digital/Electronic destination sign installation
 Audio information system
 Installation of new traction motors
 Thyristor-controlled motor traction system
 Refurbishing of the interior, which varies by city and transport authority
 Pantograph replacement (depending on the transport authority)

More radical modernization includes insertion of a low-floor section (e.g. Tatra K3R-NT).

References

External links

 Tatra-Strassenbahnen (DE)
 Volgograd metrotram: T3 showroom Web3D world with Tatra T3 model

Tatra trams
Tram vehicles of Croatia
Tram vehicles of the Czech Republic
Tatra T3D
Tram vehicles of Latvia
Tram vehicles of Romania
Tram vehicles of Russia
Tram vehicles of Ukraine
600 V DC multiple units